'''Introduction: Dr. Vellore A. R. Srinivasan is a Classical Carnatic vocalist, percussionist and Vaggeyakara     (one who composes the lyrics and music). He is a Professor and Research Guide in the department of Biochemistry at Mahatma Gandhi Medical College & Research Institute (MGMCRI)  (https://mgmcri.ac.in/, a constituent unit of Sri Balaji Vidyapeeth, Pondicherry (SBV)  https://sbvu.ac.in/ Pondicherry. SBV figures among the top 100 Universities in India, as per Ministry of Education, NIRF (https://www.nirfindia.org/Home) and has been accredited with A ++ Grade by NAAC (http://naac.gov.in/index.php/en/. MGMCRI hospital has been accredited by NABH (https://nabh.co/#gsc.tab=0). Dr. Srinivasan is presently the Registrar of Sri Balaji Vidyapeeth https://sbvu.ac.in/registrar/.

 
Early life and Education: Dr. Srinivasan was born on 6 November 1962 in Vellore, Tamilnadu, India https://vellore.nic.in/ to Pushpa Raghavan and A.S. V. Raghavan, Former Asst. Gen. Supdt. C.M.C. Hospital, Vellore. He had his schooling in Savio Nursery School (Savio Matriculation School  W44H+FX3, R.C. Church Road, Vellore, Tamil Nadu). Dr.Srinivasan completed his high schooling at NKMHSS { http://www.nkmhss.org/) in the year 1978.
Higher Education: Dr.Srinivasan had his undergraduate education at Voorhees College, Vellore, Tamil Nadu, India ( https://voorheescollege.edu.in/ )and obtained a first class degree in Chemistry in 1982. During his academic stint at Voorhees College, he served as the Charter President of Rotaract Club of Voorhees College (https://www.rotary.org/en/get-involved/rotaract-clubs ).  Dr.Srinivasan pursued his  M. Sc. Biochemistry (Faculty of Medicine) at Christian Medical College, Vellore                              (https://www.cmch-vellore.edu/ )  and emerged as the topper in the University of Madras (https://www.unom.ac.in/).  A recipient of C.S.I.R. Junior and Senior Research fellowships (https://csirhrdg.res.in/Home/Index/1/Default/2675/57), Dr. Srinivasan completed his Ph.D. degree in Biochemistry from Mysore University (https://uni-mysore.ac.in/) in the year  2000, following doctoral work carried out at the Central Food Technological Research Institute, Mysore, India                                                (https://www.cftri.res.in/).  Srinivasan is one of the inventors of a patent in the medicine category titled "A process for the preparation of intracellular Phenylalanine ammonia-lyase enzyme" (https://patestate.com/category.jsp?ll=1&cl=A61&ca=Medicine)

 
Music
Training in music: Vellore A. R. Srinivasan is a maverick who believes that the quality of learning the nuances of classical music is synonymous with the pleasure of “learning  through listening to the great masters”, rather than subjecting oneself to the rigmarole of formal teaching. However, when he was past twenty five years of age, he did receive informal  lessons in Carnatic vocal from the Vidwans, namely  Sembiakudi Janakiraman, M.R.Srinivasan and Bellary M.Ragavendra (https://en.wikipedia.org/wiki/Ballary_M._Raghavendra). Srinivasan learnt the art of playing percussion instruments from (Late) Vidwan Vellore C.M.Kuttiappa. Later, Dr. Srinivasan imbibed the nuances of percussion in classical music from Guru Tiruvarur Sri R.Krishnamoorthy(https://www.thehindu.com/features/friday-review/music/Rhythm-on-his-fingertips/article14961149.ece)

 
Compositions: The compositions are in a plethora of ragas (musical modes) prevalent in the  carnatic genre and till  date has composed over 3000  songs that include numbers on many deities of the Hindu pantheon. He has composed songs on the religious philosophers and seers of India. A separate channel on You Tube (https://www.youtube.com/user/utubevellorears) has his compositions, besides portraying his other contributions as a vocalist and percussionist. He has received awards and titles which include Nadayoga Shironmani, instituted by YOGNAT (https://narthaki.com/info/rev08/rev603.html)